Koyo Zom is the highest peak in the Hindu Raj mountain range at . The Hindu Raj mountain range sits between the Hindu Kush in the west and the Karakoram in the east.

Koyo Zom is located on the boundary of the Chitral District of Khyber Pakhtunkhwa and Gilgit-Baltistan. It was first climbed by an Austrian expedition in 1968.

See also 
 Hindu Raj
 Hindu Kush
 List of Ultras of the Karakoram and Hindu Kush

References

External links 
 Northern Pakistan detailed placemarks in Google Earth

Mountains of Gilgit-Baltistan
Mountains of Khyber Pakhtunkhwa
Six-thousanders of the Hindu Raj
Chitral District